Welbourn is an English surname. Notable people with the surname include:

Donald Welbourn, English engineer
Graham Welbourn (born 1961), Canadian swimmer
John Welbourn (born 1976), American football player
John William Welbourn (1900–1965), Canadian farmer and politician
Richard Burkewood Welbourn (1919–2005), English scientist, academic and writer
Robert Welbourn (born 1987), English Paralympic swimmer

See also
Welbourne

English-language surnames